Akkaoui is a surname. Notable people with the surname include:

Malika Akkaoui (born 1987), Moroccan middle-distance runner
Yasser Akkaoui (born 1969), Lebanese activist and journalist